Lycée Eugène-Ionesco is a  senior high-school in the  commune of Issy-les-Moulineaux, Hauts-de-Seine, in the Paris metropolitan area of France.

Infrastructure 

It consists of a single U shaped building of four storeys and possesses a small, roughly 10 meter-radius wide patch of grass and some trees, on which stepping is forbidden.

The rooms are numbered 1 to 416, with the first number always mirroring the floor it is on. The third floor hosts science labs as well as equipment storage.

Notable events 

The school population increased after a 2000s "baby boom" in the area, causing the school to become overcrowded by 2015. The school administration around that time fought so that they would be allowed to keep their Bac Pro programme.

The school's new campus was scheduled to open in 2018, with portable buildings used in the interim.

The school is ranked 20 out of 72 in the Hauts-de-Seine high school rankings, and 248 in the national ranking, based on the success rates of the Baccalauréat.

Trivia 

Despite the sign placed on the grass, its command is wildly ignored and the grass is often stepped, or slept on.

As of 2022, sexual harassment allegations have been ignored by the school's direction, forcing teachers to reach out to the rectorate. The case is still ongoing.

References

External links
 Lycée Eugène-Ionesco 

Lycées in Hauts-de-Seine